A Twig of a Wish (Persian: نهال آرزو) is a 1924 poem by Iranian poet Parvin E'tesami.

History 
Parvin Etesami (1907–1941) grew up in an intellectual environment, under supervision of her father Yusuf Etesami who had a literary background.

Etesami's poem “A Twig of a Wish” was written for her high school graduation ceremony from the Iran Bethel School in the spring of 1924. It was daring to assemble an audience at the girls’ school's ceremony, and for Etesami to speak out directly about the importance of women's education and women's rights just before the Reza Shah Pahlavi–era. In “A Twig of a Wish,” Parvin Etesami complains about the lack of respect and opportunities for woman. She asserts women's importance by pointing out that women are in charge of nurturing and educating all children (both male and female), they should have greater respect and an equal chance for education as men.

Her poem was written at a time when it was not unusual for women to be forced into marriages at young ages and not be allowed to attend school. Women's lives were very restricted during that time in Iran, and poetry was the only art in which a woman could express her thoughts and feelings. In such an atmosphere, Etesami and other early modern women writers in Iran provided a strong feminist claim for women's rights.

References 

 

Persian poems